The Return of Howard McGhee is an album by trumpeter Howard McGhee which was recorded in 1955 and released on the Bethlehem label.

Reception

Allmusic awarded the album 4 stars.

Track listing 
All compositions by Howard McGhee except as indicated
 "Get Happy" (Harold Arlen, Ted Koehler) - 3:52
 "Tahitian Lullaby" - 4:08
 "Lover Man" (Jimmy Davis, Ram Ramirez, James Sherman) - 2:50
 "Lullaby of the Leaves" (Bernice Petkere, Joe Young) - 3:22
 "You're Teasing Me" - 2:15
 "Transpicuous" - 2:36
 "Rifftide (Hackensack)" (Thelonious Monk) - 5:37
 "Oo-Wee But I Do" - 5:11
 "Don't Blame Me" (Dorothy Fields, Jimmy McHugh) - 3:09
 "Tweedles" - 3:10
 "I'll Remember April" (Gene DePaul, Patricia Johnston, Don Raye) - 5:47

Personnel 
Howard McGhee - trumpet
Sahib Shihab - baritone saxophone, alto saxophone (tracks 1, 2, 4-9 & 11)
Duke Jordan - piano
Percy Heath - bass
Philly Joe Jones - drums

References 

 

Howard McGhee albums
1956 albums
Bethlehem Records albums